Pleasantville is an unincorporated community in Jefferson Township, Sullivan County, in the U.S. state of Indiana.

The community is part of the Terre Haute Metropolitan Statistical Area.

History
A post office was established at Pleasantville in 1865, and remained in operation until it was discontinued in 1964.

Geography

Education

Pleasantville's high school, built in 1916, closed in 1965 when it was consolidated into Union High School in nearby Dugger. However, the high school gym, constructed in 1954, is still used by the community. It hosted a Union High School basketball game in the 2014–15 season, with the Union team wearing Pleasantvllle Blue Streak uniforms.

References

Unincorporated communities in Sullivan County, Indiana
Unincorporated communities in Indiana
Terre Haute metropolitan area